Jo Kwang (born 5 August 1994) is a North Korean footballer. He represented North Korea on at least three occasions between 2013 and 2014, scoring once.

Career statistics

International

International goals
Scores and results list North Korea's goal tally first, score column indicates score after each North Korea goal.

References

External links
 

1994 births
Living people
Sportspeople from Pyongyang
North Korean footballers
North Korea youth international footballers
North Korea international footballers
Association football forwards
Sobaeksu Sports Club players